Oxycopis falli is a species of false blister beetle in the family Oedemeridae. It is found in the Caribbean and North America.

References

Further reading

 

Oedemeridae
Beetles of North America
Insects of the Caribbean
Taxa named by Willis Blatchley
Beetles described in 1928
Articles created by Qbugbot